Oleg Vladimirovich Antonenko (born 1 July 1971 in Minsk, Byelorussian SSR, Soviet Union) is a Belarusian professional former ice hockey left wing.

Antonenko began playing professional in 1988 with Dynamo Minsk of the Soviet League. He has also played for Severstal, Nizhnekamsk Neftekhimik, Ak Bars Kazan, Vsetin, Torpedo Nizhny Novgorod, Metallurg Novokuznetsk, HC MVD, and Yekaterinburg Automobilist.

Antonenko was selected for the Belarus national men's ice hockey team in the 2002 Winter Olympics and the 2010 Winter Olympics.

Assistant head coach of Belarusian national ice hockey team from 2014.

Career statistics

Regular season and playoffs

International

External links
 

1971 births
Living people
Ak Bars Kazan players
Avtomobilist Yekaterinburg players
Belarusian ice hockey forwards
Expatriate ice hockey players in Russia
HC Dinamo Minsk players
Metallurg Novokuznetsk players
HC MVD players
HC Neftekhimik Nizhnekamsk players
Ice hockey players at the 1998 Winter Olympics
Ice hockey players at the 2002 Winter Olympics
Ice hockey players at the 2010 Winter Olympics
Molot-Prikamye Perm players
Olympic ice hockey players of Belarus
Severstal Cherepovets players
Soviet ice hockey forwards
Ice hockey people from Minsk
Torpedo Nizhny Novgorod players